Jourdan Urbach is an entrepreneur and retired professional violinist/composer. He was born in Roslyn, New York and currently resides in New York City.

Early life and education
Jourdan Urbach was born on Long Island, New York to Deborah and Victor Urbach. He started playing the violin before he was 3 years old and was playing the violin professionally by the age of 7. His debut was at prestigious Carnegie Hall at the age of 6. At age 7, Urbach and his parents started Children Helping Children, a charity organization, which performed at locations such as Carnegie Hall and the Lincoln Center. Concerts for a Cure, raised over 4.7 million dollars by the time Urbach started attending college at Yale University. At the age of 9, he became involved in Alzheimer's research at Cold Spring Harbor Laboratory. Later, Urbach attended Juilliard, where he was featured in Teen People's 20 under 20 list at the age of 13. Urbach entered Yale at the age of 17, where he received a B.A. in liberal arts. During this same period, he wrote the score for the short film "Elah and the Moon", which debuted at the Tribeca Film festival.

As an undergraduate, Urbach started the International Coalition of College Philanthropists (ICCP) and the International Coalition of College Philanthropists. The ICCP is “is a council of college-age philanthropic entrepreneurs dedicated to coordinating and maximizing the effectiveness of fundraising operations at college campuses across the world.” In his senior year at Yale, Urbach was chosen by ASCAP to write the score for the trailer at the Columbia Film Festival, which premiered at Lincoln Center and the IFC (International Film Center). Shortly before graduation, he was awarded the National Jefferson Award.

Later life
Urbach later moved back to New York as the National Director of the Jefferson Awards He made this move to help the organization pivot from a focus on volunteerism towards a modern suite of social entrepreneurism programming. Urbach served in this capacity for a year and half before becoming the Director of Research and Development and running mobile information architecture at the Brooklyn cloud technology startup MiMedia. Urbach now lives in New York City's Upper East Side, where he serves as CTO of the same company he co-founded in early 2013, Mass Lab, which builds a mobile video platform called Ocho, which attracted in 2014 over 1.7m USD in investment from Mark Cuban and others.

He currently serves as an advisor and consultant to a number of emergent companies in the New York technology space. Urbach was the also the curator of the World Economic Forum Global Shapers (New York chapter) and works as a Goodwill Ambassador to the UN Arts for Peace Council.

Awards
 Winner, 2nd Place Grand Award, “Super Oligodendrocytes,” INTEL-International Science & Engineering Fair (ISEF), 2009
 Winner, American Academy of Neurology Neuroscience Research Prize, 2009
 Winner of University of the Sciences INTEL-ISEF Scholarship, 2008
 Coca-Cola National Scholar, 2009
 Toyota Community Scholars National Award, 2009
 Claes Nobel Academic Scholarship Award, 2009
 National AXA Achievement Scholar, 2009
 Nestle Very Best in Youth Scholarship Award, 2009
 Tribeca Disruptive Innovator Award 2012
 National Jefferson Award, 2012 
 State and National Winner of The Prudential Spirit of Community Scholarship Award, 2007
 Chosen as one of the Twenty Teens Who Will Change the World by Teen People Magazine, 2006
 Winner of Dr. Martin Luther King Jr. Humanitarian Award, 2006.
 Founder and Director, Children Helping Children 1998 - Ongoing
 Founder and President, The international Coalition of College Philanthropists 2009 - 2012 
 Direction of Communications, Nestle Foundation 2010 - 2011

References

External links
 Ocho Launch Announcement

1991 births
Living people
Jewish American musicians
Juilliard School alumni
People from the Upper East Side
People from Roslyn, New York
Yale College alumni
American chief technology officers
21st-century American Jews